Attleboro station may refer to:

Attleboro station (Massachusetts), an MBTA train station in Attleboro, Massachusetts
Attleboro (RTA Rapid Transit station), a rapid transit station in Shaker Heights, Ohio
South Attleboro (MBTA station), another MBTA train station in Attleboro, Massachusetts

See also
Attleborough (disambiguation)
Attleborough railway station